William Henry Savage (March 15, 1840 - May 25, 1930) served in the California State Assembly for the 72nd district from 1901 to 1903. He also served in the California State Senate for the 34th district from 1903 to 1911 and during the American Civil War he served in the US Army.  William Henry Savage was born in County Limerick, Ireland, likely on July 12, 1837.  He was educated in Massachusetts prior to enlisting in the Civil War.  He died on May 25, 1930, in San Pedro, California.

References

Union Army personnel
1930 deaths
Republican Party members of the California State Assembly
1840 births
20th-century American politicians
Republican Party California state senators